The 1966 Princeton Tigers football team was an American football team that represented Princeton University during the 1966 NCAA University Division football season. Princeton shared the championship of the Ivy League in a three-way tie.

In their tenth year under head coach Dick Colman, the Tigers compiled a 7–2 record and outscored opponents 135 to 103. Walter J. Kozumbo was the team captain.

Princeton's 6–1 conference record earned a three-way tie for first place in the Ivy League standings. The Tigers outscored Ivy opponents 119 to 84. Princeton defeated one of its co-champions, Harvard, while suffering its only in-conference loss to the other co-champion, Dartmouth. 

Princeton played its home games at Palmer Stadium on the university campus in Princeton, New Jersey.

Schedule

References

Princeton
Princeton Tigers football seasons
Ivy League football champion seasons
Princeton Tigers football